Matt Reem (born December 23, 1972) is a former American football offensive lineman and tight end in the National Football League for the Washington Redskins, the Miami Dolphins and the New England Patriots. He played college football at the University of Minnesota. He played high school football at Concordia Academy in St. Paul, Minnesota.

References

1972 births
Living people
Sportspeople from Racine, Wisconsin
American football offensive linemen
American football tight ends
Minnesota Golden Gophers football players
Washington Redskins players
Miami Dolphins players
New England Patriots players